Robert Cauer the Elder (13 February 1831, Dresden - 2 April 1893, Kassel) was a German sculptor; known for his funerary art.

Life and work 

His father, Emil Cauer the Elder and brother, Karl were both sculptors.

He received his first lessons at his father's studio in Bad Kreuznach. From 1851 to 1856, he studied painting at the Kunstakademie Düsseldorf with Wilhelm von Schadow and Karl Ferdinand Sohn. From 1853 to 1854, he also studied at the academy's building school with Rudolf Wiegmann. From 1851 to 1857, he was a member of Malkasten, a progressive artists' association. After completing his studies, he worked with his father and returned to Sculpting, but never gave up painting entirely. Between 1856 and 1861, he made numerous study trips throughout Germany, England and Italy. In 1882, he settled in Rome, where he would live  for the rest of his life. 

Together with his brother, Karl, he set up a studio there, but would continue to be involved with the one in Bad Kreuznach. From 1887, he was officially commissioned by the Prussian government to supervise their  scholarship students at the Villa Strohl-Fern. The following year, he was named a Professor. After 1889, he divided his time between Rome and Kassel. 

His sculptures were inspired by topics from literature and folklore, and he often emulated his father's works. He also created numerous portrait plaques that were based on Classical models.

His most familiar works may be his grave monuments, including several at the Alter Friedhof, Bonn; notably those of Friedrich Wilhelm August Argelander and Nikolaus Simrock.

References

Further reading 
 
 Hans Wolfgang Singer (Ed.): Allgemeines Künstlerlexikon. Leben und Werke der berühmtesten bildenden Künstler, Vol.1. Literarische Anstalt Rütten & Loening, Frankfurt1921.
  (Ed.): Lexikon der Düsseldorfer Malerschule 1819–1918. Vol.1 Abbema–Gurlitt. Published by the Kunstmuseum Düsseldorfin Ehrenhof and the Galerie Paffrath. Bruckmann, Munich 1997, .

External links 

 
 Entry on cauer @ the Rheinland-Pfälzische Personendatenbank

1831 births
1893 deaths
19th-century German sculptors
Artists from Dresden
Kunstakademie Düsseldorf alumni
Funerary art